CSID may refer to:

Called Subscriber Identification for fax machines
Congenital Sucrase-Isomaltase Deficiency